Huang Qiang (born April 1963) is a Chinese politician, currently serving as governor of Sichuan Province of China since December 2020.

Early life and education 
Huang Qiang was born in Dongyang County, Zhejiang. 

Huang completed his undergraduate education with a major in aerospace electrical engineering in 1983 at Northwestern Polytechnical University in Xi'an. He received a Master of Engineering in aerospace electrical engineering in 1990 and a Doctor of Engineering in management science and engineering in 2006 from Northwestern Polytechnical University.

Career 
Huang served as secretary general of the Commission for Science, Technology and Industry for National Defense from 2006 to 2008, deputy director of the State Administration for Science, Technology and Industry for National Defense from 2008 to 2014, deputy governor of Gansu Province from 2014 to 2018, executive deputy governor of Gansu from 2017 to 2018, and executive deputy governor of Henan Province from 2018 to 2020.

In December 2020, Huang was named deputy Party secretary and acting governor of Sichuan. He was elected as governor of Sichuan in February 2021.

Huang is a delegate to the 13th National People's Congress.

References 

1963 births
Living people
Northwestern Polytechnical University alumni
Chinese Communist Party politicians from Zhejiang
People from Dongyang
Governors of Sichuan
Delegates to the 13th National People's Congress
Members of the 20th Central Committee of the Chinese Communist Party